Pál Ordódy de Ordód et Rozsonmiticz (26 August 1822 – 26 August 1885) was a Hungarian politician, who served as Minister of Public Works and Transport from 1880 to 1882.

References
 Magyar Életrajzi Lexikon

1822 births
1885 deaths
Public Works and Transport ministers of Hungary
People from Pest, Hungary